Words on the Floor is the debut album by singer-songwriter Tommy Reilly, released on 21 September 2009. It was produced by Bernard Butler and recorded in Edwyn Collins' studio. There were three tracks offered on iTunes only for pre-ordering the album.

Track listing 
"Grab Me by the Collar"  
"Jackets"  
"Dials"  
"Kick the Covers"  
"Words on the Floor"  
"Tell Me So"  
"Minds on Other Things"  
"Having No-One"  
"Just Like the Weather"  
"Gimme a Call"  
"Entertaining Thoughts"
"I Don't Like Coffee" (hidden track)
"Cards on the Table" (pre-order only on iTunes)
"Torrance" (pre-order only on iTunes)
"Gimme a Call" (Demo) (pre-order only on iTunes)

Tour
During the summer, Reilly played at several festivals including a headlining spot on the T Break Stage at T In The Park.  He then went on to tour the UK that autumn.

He also played various gigs in Scotland including a sell-out show at Glasgow ABC as well as Homecoming at the SECC.

Credits
Musicians
Tommy Reilly – vocals, Guitars, Keyboard
Makoto Sakamoto – drums, Percussion 
Bernard Butler – bass
Scott Neilson – bass (Track 3)
Ian Burdge – Cello (Tracks 8 & 11)
Additional personnel
Bernard Butler – production, engineering
Chris Potter – Mastering

References

2009 debut albums
Tommy Reilly (Scottish musician) albums
Albums produced by Bernard Butler
Polydor Records albums